Oceanisphaera psychrotolerans is a Gram-negative, aerobic and non-motile bacterium from the genus of Oceanisphaera which has been isolated from sediments from the coast of the Bohai Sea in China.

References 

Aeromonadales
Bacteria described in 2015